Danny Faundez (born February 2, 1993) is an American professional soccer player who plays as a goalkeeper for USL Championship club Louisville City.

Club career

Youth & College
Faundez played in Chile with Santiago Wanderers and then Everton's youth academy for three years, before attending Bellevue College, where he played college soccer.

Professional
On August 19, 2015, Faundez signed with United Soccer League side Seattle Sounders FC 2.

After a period out of the game, Faundez signed with USL Championship side Orange County SC in 2020. He re-signed with the club ahead of their 2021 season.

On February 22, 2022, Faundez signed with USL Championship club Louisville City after a successful trial. On April 6, 2022, Faundez was loaned to USL League One's ahead of their inaugural season.  He made his professional debut the same day, starting in a Lamar Hunt U.S. Open Cup game against Colorado Springs Switchbacks.

References

1993 births
Living people
American soccer players
Association football goalkeepers
Everton de Viña del Mar footballers
Louisville City FC players
Northern Colorado Hailstorm FC players
Orange County SC players
Sportspeople from Seattle
Soccer players from Washington (state)
Tacoma Defiance players
USL League One players